Michael Lüftner (born 14 March 1994) is a Czech professional footballer who plays as a centre back.

Club career

Teplice

He has spent his early career in the Czech First League club Teplice. He broke into the first team squad early in the 2012–13 season, making his league debut in an 0–2 loss against Hradec Králové in October 2012. He scored his first league goal in November 2012 against defending champions Slovan Liberec, helping his team to a 3–0 victory. He became an integral part of Teplice's first team in the 2013–14 season, playing 8 whole league matches in a row before being sent off after 28 minutes in the 9th round against Příbram.

Slavia Prague

In December 2016, he signed for Slavia Prague on a contract until 2020 for an undisclosed fee reported to be over €500,000. He made his debut for Slavia in their next competitive match - a 2–0 Czech First League home win against Jihlava on 19 February 2017.

Copenhagen
On 11 May 2017, Slavia Prague officials announced that Copenhagen triggered the release clause on Lüftner's contract by a bid of €1,5 million. The move was confirmed four days later.

Omonia Nicosia
On 20 June 2019, Cypriot First Division club Omonia Nicosia announced that Lüftner will join the club as a loan from FC Copenhagen. He made his debut on 24 August 2019 against Doxa Katokopias in the 2019-20 season premiere. He scored his first goal (6/2/20) in the 52nd minute in the Cyprus Cup against Doxa Katokopias. His first goal in the Cypriot First Division(7/12/20) was against APOEL in the 38th minute.

Fehérvár
On 3 June 2021 it was confirmed, that Lüftner had joined Nemzeti Bajnokság I club Fehérvár FC from Copenhagen with immediate effect. On 31 August 2022, his contract was terminated by mutual consent.

International career

He represented his country on UEFA U17 Championship in 2011. He was first called up to the senior Czech national team in August 2017 to face Germany and Northern Ireland in the World Cup qualifiers, but failed to make an appearance. He was again called up in September to face Azerbaijan and San Marino in the same competition, making his debut against San Marino on 8 October.

Career statistics

Honours
Copenhagen
Danish Superliga: 2018–19

Omonia
Cypriot First Division: 2020–21

References

External links
 Michael Lüftner official international statistics
 
 

1994 births
Living people
Czech footballers
Czech expatriate footballers
Czech Republic youth international footballers
Czech people of German descent
Czech Republic international footballers
Czech Republic under-21 international footballers
People from Chabařovice
Association football defenders
Czech First League players
Danish Superliga players
Cypriot First Division players
Nemzeti Bajnokság I players
FK Teplice players
SK Slavia Prague players
F.C. Copenhagen players
AC Omonia players
Fehérvár FC players
Czech expatriate sportspeople in Denmark
Czech expatriate sportspeople in Cyprus
Czech expatriate sportspeople in Hungary
Expatriate men's footballers in Denmark
Expatriate footballers in Cyprus
Expatriate footballers in Hungary
Sportspeople from the Ústí nad Labem Region